Jimmy Wayne Haynes (born September 5, 1972) is an American former professional baseball right-handed pitcher.

Haynes was selected by the Baltimore Orioles in the 7th round of the 1991 Major League Baseball Draft. He made his Major League Baseball (MLB) debut in the  season and was later sent to the Oakland Athletics.

In his major league career, Haynes had a win–loss record of 63-89, with 762 strikeouts and an earned run average (ERA) of 5.37, which is the worst ERA of all time among pitchers who have pitched at least 1000 innings.

External links

2004 statistics at ESPN

1972 births
Living people
American expatriate baseball players in Canada
Baltimore Orioles players
Baseball players from Georgia (U.S. state)
Bowie Baysox players
Cincinnati Reds players
Dayton Dragons players
Durham Bulls players
Edmonton Trappers players
Frederick Keys players
Gulf Coast Orioles players
Kane County Cougars players
Louisville Bats players
Major League Baseball pitchers
Milwaukee Brewers players
Oakland Athletics players
People from LaGrange, Georgia
Rochester Red Wings players
Toledo Mud Hens players